, known also as  or  (born Kanagawa, 16 July 1970) is a former Japanese rugby union player who played as a flanker.

Career
Originally from Kanagawa, Izawa was educated at Daito Bunka University, where he played between 1991 and 1995. Izawa also played for Ricoh, Tokyo Gas and Sanyo in the Japan Company Rugby Championship. Izawa was first called up for Japan by the then-head coach Osamu Koyabu in 1995, playing his first match against Tonga, in Nagoya, on 11 February 1995. He was also part of the 1995 Rugby World Cup squad, where he played two matches. His last cap was against Korea, in Bangkok, on 18 December 1998.

Notes

References
Ko Izawa international statistics

1970 births
Living people
Japanese rugby union players
Rugby union flankers
Saitama Wild Knights players
Black Rams Tokyo players
Japan international rugby union players
Sportspeople from Kanagawa Prefecture
Asian Games medalists in rugby union
Rugby union players at the 1998 Asian Games
Asian Games silver medalists for Japan
Medalists at the 1998 Asian Games